Transworld Motocross (TWMX) was a magazine that covered motocross and motocross racing based in Carlsbad, California. The magazine was launched in 2000.

The magazine's content includes: racing, event coverage, freestyle motocross, bike maintenance, riding tips and product reviews.

Transworld Motocross is a Transworld Media brand, which also published the magazines Transworld Surf, Transworld Skateboarding, and Transworld Snowboarding. In 2013, most of the Transworld titles were sold by Bonnier to Source Interlink Media (now the TEN Publishing). Since then, TEN Publishing has been sold to American Media, LLC who shuttered all Transworld Media publications.

References

External links

Bonnier Group
Defunct magazines published in the United States
Magazines established in 2000
Magazines disestablished in 2019
Magazines published in California
Monthly magazines published in the United States
Sports magazines published in the United States